The Adventures of Pinocchio (Italian: Un burattino di nome Pinocchio, literally A puppet named Pinocchio) is a 1972 Italian animated fantasy film produced by Cartoons Cinematografica Italiana. An adaptation of Carlo Collodi's 1883 book The Adventures of Pinocchio, it is written, produced, directed and edited by Giuliano Cenci. The English dub, narrated by Victor Jory, was released in the United States by G.G. Communications in 1978.

Production

Development
The film was directed by Giuliano Cenci with assistance from his brother Renzo. During production, Carlo Collodi's grandchildren Mario and Antonio Lorenzini were consulted. The subtle movements made by fidgeting children whilst speaking or under scrutiny were incorporated into Pinocchio's movements, particularly when he lies to the Fairy with the Turquoise Hair over the fate of his gold coins. For the design of the Fairy, Italian portrayals of the Blessed Virgin Mary in art were used as starting points.

Design
For the design of Pinocchio, the animators took inspiration to illustrations made by Attilio Mussino. The backgrounds were painted by Sicillian artist Alberto D'Angelo and Abramo Scortecci who both used tone styles evocative of early 20th-century Italian art with little focus on surrealism as in the Disney adaptation.

Plot

Cast

Original Italian version
Renato Rascel was chosen to serve as both the singer of the introductory song and as the narrator. He was permitted to occasionally ad lib in order to get the film's message across, and to give it a truly Italian feel.
 Renato Rascel as the Narrator
 Roberta Paladini as Pinocchio
 Roberto Bertea as Geppetto
 Manlio De Angelis as The Cat (Il Gatto)
 Vittoria Febbi as the Blue Fairy (La Fata Turchina)
 Michele Gammino as Mangiafuoco
 Lauro Gazzolo as the Talking Cricket (Il Grillo Parlante)
 Flaminia Jandolo as Lucignolo
 Sergio Tedesco as The Fox (La Volpe)
 Gianni Bonagura as the Coachman (L'Omino)
 Arturo Dominici as the Green Fisherman (Il Pescatore Verde)
 Gianfranco Bellini as the pigeon (Il Colombo)

English-dubbed version
In 1978, an English-dubbed version was released in the US by G.G. Communications directed by Jesse Vogel.

 Patricia Parris as Pinocchio
 Dallas McKennon as Geppetto
 Paul Frees as The Green Fisherman
 Bob Holt as Mangiafuoco
 Don Messick as The Cat
 Martha Scott as the Blue Fairy
 Alan Sues as The Fox (mistakenly called "The Wolf")

See also
List of animated feature-length films

References

External links

1972 films
1972 animated films
1970s fantasy films
Italian animated films
1970s Italian-language films
Animated films based on children's books
1970s children's fantasy films
Pinocchio films
Animated films based on novels
Italian animated fantasy films
1970s Italian films